The QJZ-171, also known as the Type 171 heavy machine gun, is a Chinese heavy machine gun designed and manufactured by Norinco for the People's Liberation Army. It fires a type of specialized 12.7×108mm light-weight ammunition. The weapon is intended to replace the QJZ-89 heavy machine gun.

Description
The QJZ-171 is designed as an ultra-lightweight heavy machine gun, similar to American XM312 and XM806. The whole system, including the tripod, weighs , in which the gun weighs  and the tripod weighs . The gun features a free-floating barrel, improved muzzle brake, composite ammo belt with new lightweight ammunition, and titanium alloy gun parts to reduce recoil and weight. The machine gun is fitted with its own bipod attached to the receiver, and can be carried by one infantry or served by a crew of two. Ammo containers are made of plastic composites to reduce weight.

The machine gun is an open-bolt and gas-operated mechanism with a rotating bolt. The hybrid short recoil system reduces peak recoil, achieved with the barrel, gas system, and bolt assembly recoiling inside the outer housing.

The weapon features several improvements to reduce weight, mitigate recoil and increase accuracy. The new 12.7mm armor-piercing incendiary round made of special alloy only weighs 100 grams. The gas system cycles the bolt group with the free-floating receiver recoils inside the outer gun housing to decrease recoil. Two sets of spring buffer are mounted around the receiver. The barrel is fitted with improved muzzle brake. At , the gun can engage vehicle-sized targets with 70% hit probability.

Users
: People's Liberation Army

See also
 QJZ-89
 QJY-201
 XM806
 LWMMG
 Kord machine gun

References

Machine guns of the People's Republic of China
Heavy machine guns
12.7×108 mm machine guns